At least three warships of Japan have been named Hiei, after Mount Hiei:
 , a 1870s  corvette of the Imperial Japanese Navy.
 , a 1912  of the Imperial Japanese Navy.

Japanese Navy ship names
Imperial Japanese Navy ship names